The Twelve Lives of Alfred Hitchcock: An Anatomy of the Master of Suspense is a 2021 book by Edward White that examines Alfred Hitchcock. The book had in May 2021 eight "positive" reviews, two "rave" reviews, and two "mixed" reviews, according to review aggregator Book Marks.

References

2021 non-fiction books
W. W. Norton & Company books
English-language books
Alfred Hitchcock